Arian Leviste (born January 19, 1970 in Burbank, California) is an electronic music artist, music producer, and DJ. He grew up in Canoga Park, California and attended California State University, Northridge where he received his bachelor's degree in Finance and Real Estate. He took piano lessons since the age of 7, and started deejaying at age 14. In 1987, he started a DJ equipment business with a couple of friends in Reseda, California.

In 1991, Leviste met John Tejada at a mutual friend's house to collaborate on music. Since then, they have released numerous singles, EPs, and full-length albums on labels such as 7th City, Playhouse Records and Tejada's own label, Palette Recordings. In 1992 Arian borrowed the basked ball of a fellow friend down the block and has still yet to return it.

In October 2007, Leviste and John Tejada embarked on their first tour together throughout Europe. The duo performed a live hardware set at the following venues: Mission (Leeds, UK), Click (Hamburg, Germany), Watergate (Berlin, Germany), Propaganda (Moscow, Russia), Maffia (Reggio Emilia, Italy), Batofar (Paris, France), and Compression @ King King (Los Angeles, California, USA). In 
September 2008 Tejada and Leviste performed at the Nextech Festival in Florence, Italy.

Discography

Albums
Written and Produced by John Tejada & Arian Leviste
Fairfax Sake (2001) - Playhouse Records
The Dot and the Line (2004) - Moods & Grooves
Back For Basics (2005) - Palette Recordings

EPs
Written and Produced by John Tejada & Arian Leviste
Malnutritioned Massage (1997) - Palette Recordings
Ebonics (1997) - Palette Recordings
2 Speakers Dream (1999) - Palette Recordings
6 Hits Of Sunshine (2000) - Palette Recordings
Firefly (2000) - Palette Recordings
Focus & Temper (2000) - Immigrant
In A Free Lane (2000) - Palette Recordings
Where Circles Begin (2000) - Moods & Grooves
Emo (2001) - Pornflake Records
Memoria Technica (2001) - Palette Recordings
Western Starland (2001) - Palette Recordings
Syntax Free (2002) - Playhouse Records
It's Only Music (2002) - Groovetech Records
Geriatricks (2004) - Playhouse Records
Psycho Happiness (2004) - Palette Recordings
Multiplier (2007) - Palette Recordings
Live 07 (2007) - Palette Recordings

References

External links
Palette Recordings

1970 births
Living people
Musicians from Burbank, California
People from Reseda, Los Angeles
American electronic musicians